Amyema gibberula is an aerial hemiparasitic plant of the family Loranthaceae native to Australia and found in Western Australia, the Northern Territory, and South Australia.

Description
It flowers in dyads (groups of two flowers) and usually has four petals. The filaments of the stamens are shorter than the anthers of the stamen.
Its green, red, pink and white flowers can be seen from April to September or November to December. The leaves are terete (cylindrical and long).

Ecology
A. gibberula is found on  various species of Hakea and Grevillea.

Taxonomy
It was first described by Tate in 1886 as Loranthus gibberulus, with its genus being changed to Amyema by Danser in 1992.

References

gibberula
Eudicots of Western Australia
Flora of the Northern Territory
Flora of South Australia
Parasitic plants
Epiphytes
Plants described in 1886
Taxa named by Ralph Tate